Volley Milano is an Italian men's volleyball club based in Milan which plays in SuperLega.

Achievements
CEV Cup (1)
 (×1) 2022
Italian Championship
 (×1) 2001

History
Volley Milano was founded in 1999  following the separation of a part of the corporate group from Gonzaga Milano from whom it acquires the title sport, starting his racing activities in the 1999–00 season from A2 Series: thanks to the second place in the standings, the team is promoted to Serie A1.

In the 2000–01 season so, Volley Milano makes its debut in the maximum Italian division, obtaining at the end of the regular season fourth in the standings and then coming to the championship final series lost against Sisley Treviso: these results allow the Milanese team to participate for the first time in European competition, namely the 2000-01 CEV Cup, which will be eliminated in the semifinals by Cuneo, then winning the final for third place [2]. In the two following seasons the club always keeps mid-table positions, without going beyond the Scudetto semifinals: in 2003 the first team is melted in Volley Piacenza and now starts from the lower categories.

In 2008 he formed the Vero Volley, a consortium of eight teams operating between Milan and Brianza, who also participates in the Volley Milano: in 2010 the company acquired the sporting title of one of these teams, the Sporting Union Pro Victoria, who had won the championship of B1 series getting the chance to play the A2 Series [1]; in the 2010–11 season the Milanese club then returns in the cadet championship. In the 2012–13 season moves headquarters of play from Milan to Monza, using as a sponsor the name of the consortium, while the following season, after reaching the final in the Italian Cup category, he was promoted to Serie A1, with a victory in the promotion play-off.

Team
Team roster – season 2022/2023

References

External links 
 Official website
 Team profile at Volleybox.net

Italian volleyball clubs
Volleyball clubs established in 1999
Sport in Milan
1999 establishments in Italy